Mark Rasenick is an American biologist focusing on G protein signaling in the nervous system, the relationship of neurotransmitter activation to rapid modification of the cytoskeleton, how G proteins and the cytoskeleton work in concert to modify synaptic shape and form a molecular basis for depression and the action of antidepressant drugs.

Rasenick works at the University of Illinois, and is an Elected Fellow of the American Association for the Advancement of Science. He has made significant contributions towards advancing the understanding of neurotransmitter signaling and the biology of mood disorders, and his research helped identify a membrane protein, the localization of which can be used as a biomarker for depression.

References

Year of birth missing (living people)
Living people
Fellows of the American Association for the Advancement of Science
21st-century American biologists
Wesleyan University alumni
University of Illinois faculty